The Briz-K, Briz-KM and Briz-M ( meaning Breeze-K, KM and M) are Russian liquid-propellant rocket orbit insertion upper stages manufactured by Khrunichev State Research and Production Space Center and used on the Proton-M and Angara A5. The upper stages were also used on Rokot, one of Russia's smaller launchers, before its retirement in 2019.

Characteristics

Briz-K and Briz-KM 
Briz-K, GRAU index 14S12, is a single-piece structure with a conical tank compartment and the engine located in a recess in the fuel tank. Briz-KM (GRAU index 14S45) is an improved version of Briz-K. The Briz-K and Briz-KM were used as a third stage of the Rokot launch vehicles.

Briz-M 
Briz-M, GRAU index 14S43, is designed for injecting large payloads into a low, medium-height or high geosynchronous orbit. Briz-M is a twin upper stage consisting of a core module (using Briz-KM as the baseline) and a jettisonable add-on toroidal tank surrounding the core. It is powered by a pump-fed gimballed main engine, the 14D30. The main engine can be restarted 8 times in flight and allows precision placement of the spacecraft into orbit. Orbital lifetime of the Briz-M is limited by available onboard battery power and is currently 24 hours. The total time of the standard Proton/Briz-M mission to geosynchronous orbit profile from lift-off to spacecraft separation is approximately 9.3 hours. A Proton launch vehicle with a Briz-M upper stage can also inject payloads to Earth escape trajectories.

One of system's design goals has been to keep overall dimensions as small as possible. Briz-M takes much less space on board the launch vehicle compared to its predecessor, the Block D upper stage, leaving freed volume for the cargo. A Proton with a Briz-M can place a 4,385 kg satellite, such as an A2100AX, into a target orbit with an apogee of 35,786 km, a perigee of 7,030 km, and an inclination of 17.3°. Maximum lift capability of the Briz-M stage is 5,645 kg to geosynchronous transfer orbit with a 1,500 m/s residual velocity to GSO. A tandem launch of multiple spacecraft is also supported, with the ability to inject the spacecraft into different orbits.

History 

The maiden flight of Briz-M took place on 5 July 1999. The flight was a failure, due to the explosion of the carrier rocket's second stage. The flight had a communications satellite as a payload.

Briz-M completed its first successful flight on 6the June 2000, when it delivered the Gorizont communications satellite into orbit.

It is planned to use Briz-M with the A3 and A5 versions of the future Angara rocket family.

Launch chronology

Proton-M/Briz-M

Rokot/Briz-K/KM

Angara A5/Briz-M

References

Expendable space launch systems
Rocket stages
Space launch vehicles of Russia